Chelymorpha phytophagica is a species of leaf beetle in the family Chrysomelidae. It is found in Central America and North America.

Subspecies
These two subspecies belong to the species Chelymorpha phytophagica:
 Chelymorpha phytophagica luteata Schaeffer
 Chelymorpha phytophagica phytophagica

References

Further reading

 
 

Cassidinae
Articles created by Qbugbot
Beetles described in 1873